Moby Dick is a 1930 American pre-Code film from Warner Bros., directed by Lloyd Bacon, and starring John Barrymore, Joan Bennett and Walter Lang. The film is a sound remake of the 1926 silent movie, The Sea Beast, which also starred Barrymore. It is the first adaption film of Herman Melville's 1851 novel Moby Dick which includes a soundtrack.

Plot
The film tells of a sea captain's maniacal quest for revenge on a great white whale that has bitten off his leg. 

After disembarking in New Bedford, Ahab Ceely meets and falls in love with Faith Mapple, the daughter of the local minister. Although courted by Ahab's brother Derek, she falls in love with the daring-do Ahab.  She is heartbroken when he leaves on another voyage, but says she will wait three years for him to return. During this next voyage, Ahab loses his right leg to Moby Dick, a white whale. When Ahab returns to New Bedford, he mistakenly believes that the woman he loves no longer wants to see him due to his disfigurement, an opinion encouraged by Ahab's brother, who wants Faith for himself. Ahab vows revenge against the whale, and to kill it or be killed in the process, and returns to sea. Eventually, Ahab raises enough capital to buy and be captain of his own ship, but no one wants to crew with him because of his passion for destroying Moby Dick. On a resupply visit to New Bedford, most of the crew deserts the ship.  Ahab directs his first mate to shanghai a crew and unknowingly takes his brother on board. Although the crew mutinies, Moby Dick is sighted, and Ahab heads the harpoon boats out to spear him; driven with a bloodlust, he harpoons Moby Dick and kills him. The crew boils the sperm whale down for whale oil, and they return to New Bedford, where Ahab and Faith are reunited.

Cast
John Barrymore as Captain Ahab Ceely
Joan Bennett as Faith Mapple
Lloyd Hughes as Derek Ceely
Noble Johnson as Queequeg
Nigel De Brulier as Elijah
Walter Long as Mr Stubbs
May Boley as Whale Oil Rosie
Tom O'Brien as Starbuck
John Ince as Reverend Mapple

Foreign-language versions
One foreign-language version of the 1930 film of Moby Dick was produced. The German version was titled Dämon des Meeres and was directed by Michael Curtiz.

Box office
According to Warner Bros. records. the film earned $579,000 domestically and $218,000 foreign.

Preservation status
The film survives intact and has been broadcast on television and cable and is available through Warner Archive DVD-on-demand. A print has long been preserved at the Library of Congress.

Comparison to novel

Moby Dick was considered a loose adaptation of the novel; Marc Di Paolo said it was "a poorly conceived and unfaithful version . . . in which Ahab . . . slays the white whale at the end and goes home to his true love."  Walter C. Metz said the film excludes the novel's central character Ishmael and "produces a conventional Hollywood love story between Ahab and Faith, the invented daughter of Rev. Mapple, whose moral purity reforms Ahab from a bawdy sailor into a marriageable man." Metz also said that the film created Ahab's back story, having a love story that does not appear in the novel.

References

External links
Moby Dick at the TCM Movie Database
 
 

1930 films
1930 adventure films
American black-and-white films
Remakes of American films
1930s English-language films
Films based on Moby-Dick
Films directed by Lloyd Bacon
Films set in the 1830s
Films set in the 1840s
American multilingual films
Sea adventure films
Sound film remakes of silent films
Warner Bros. films
American adventure films
1930 multilingual films
1930s American films